Scott Davenport, also known as "Scotty", is an American college basketball coach. He is currently the head coach of the Bellarmine Knights men's basketball team.

Early life
Davenport, a native of Bellarmine's home city of Louisville, Kentucky, grew up less than a mile from Churchill Downs in the city's South End, an area described by Sports Illustrated writer (and Louisville resident) Pat Forde as "gritty". His father died of a heart attack when he was 9 years old, and he was raised from that point by his mother, a hair stylist who had a sixth-grade education. According to Forde, Davenport "was not blessed with abundant athletic talent, but had an unquenchable love of basketball", playing at nearby Iroquois High School.

Coaching career
Davenport began his coaching career as a graduate assistant coach under Denny Crum at Louisville in 1984. He then moved on to VCU for one season as an assistant to Mike Pollio. He returned to the Louisville area as a high school head coach at Ballard High School where he'd stay for 10 seasons from 1986–1996. In his first two Ballard seasons, he led the Bruins to the state tournament finals, both against a Clay County team led by future Kentucky star Richie Farmer. The Bruins, featuring future NBA player Allan Houston in both seasons, lost in overtime in 1987 and survived a 51-point game by Farmer to win in 1988. Davenport later coached another future NBA player in DeJuan Wheat. Davenport returned to the Cardinals under Crum in 1996, and would stay on as an assistant coach for Rick Pitino. Within a year, he had lost , and has remained at his new weight ever since. Davenport remained at Louisville until 2005, when he accepted the head coaching job at Bellarmine.

Since joining the Knights, Davenport has become the all-time wins leader at the school, and has led the team to six Great Lakes Valley Conference regular season titles and five conference tournament titles, along with 12 NCAA Division II men's basketball tournament which includes four Final Four appearances (2011, 2012, 2015, 2017), and the 2011 national title.

After a 2021–22 season in which the Knights won the ASUN Conference tournament, Bellarmine named his son Doug, who had played at Bellarmine from 2006–2010 and joined the Knights coaching staff in 2016, as his designated successor upon his eventual retirement.

Personality
In a 2020 story for SI, Forde had this to say about Davenport's personality:

Head coaching record

College

References

Year of birth missing (living people)
1950s births
Living people
American men's basketball coaches
Basketball coaches from Kentucky
Bellarmine Knights men's basketball coaches
College men's basketball head coaches in the United States
High school basketball coaches in Kentucky
Iroquois High School alumni
Louisville Cardinals men's basketball coaches
Sportspeople from Louisville, Kentucky
VCU Rams men's basketball coaches